In boolean logic, a disjunctive normal form (DNF) is a canonical normal form of a logical formula consisting of a disjunction of conjunctions; it can also be described as an OR of ANDs, a sum of products, or (in philosophical logic) a cluster concept.  As a normal form, it is useful in automated theorem proving.

Definition
A logical formula is considered to be in DNF if it is a disjunction of one or more conjunctions of one or more literals. A DNF formula is in full disjunctive normal form if each of its variables appears exactly once in every conjunction. The not operator can only be used as part of a literal, which means that it can only precede a propositional variable. 

The following is a context-free grammar for DNF:
 DNF → (Conjunction)  DNF
 DNF → (Conjunction)
 Conjunction → Literal  Conjunction
 Conjunction → Literal
 Literal → Variable
 Literal → Variable
Where Variable is any variable.

For example, all of the following formulas are in DNF:

However, the following formulas are not in DNF:
, since an OR is nested within a NOT
, since an AND is nested within a NOT
, since an OR is nested within an AND

Conversion to DNF

Converting a formula to DNF involves using logical equivalences, such as double negation elimination, De Morgan's laws, and the distributive law.

All logical formulas can be converted into an equivalent disjunctive normal form. However, in some cases conversion to DNF can lead to an exponential explosion of the formula. For example, converting the formula  to DNF yields a formula with 2n terms.

Every particular Boolean function can be represented by one and only one full disjunctive normal form, one of the canonical forms. In contrast, two different plain disjunctive normal forms may denote the same Boolean function; see the illustrations.

Computational complexity
The Boolean satisfiability problem on conjunctive normal form formulas is NP-hard; by the duality principle, so is the falsifiability problem on DNF formulas. Therefore, it is co-NP-hard to decide if a DNF formula is a tautology.

Conversely, a DNF formula is satisfiable if, and only if, one of its conjunctions is satisfiable; this can be decided in polynomial time.

Variants
An important variation used in the study of computational complexity is k-DNF. A formula is in k-DNF if it is in DNF and each conjunction contains at most k literals.

See also 
 Algebraic normal form – an XOR of AND clauses
 Blake canonical form – DNF including all prime implicants
 Quine–McCluskey algorithm – algorithm for calculating prime implicants
 Propositional logic
 Truth table

Notes

References

External links
 

Normal forms (logic)